Luis Eduardo Hicks Castillo (born November 27, 1978) is a Chilean former footballer who played as a defender.

Career

Hicks first played for Provincial Osorno, before moving to Rangers de Talca, and Unión Española, all three clubs being in his homeland. 

His next destination was to be Indonesia, where he played for another three clubs, PSMS Medan, Medan Jaya and Persikabo Bogor until 2008 when he moved to Singapore to play for Sengkang Punggol and Woodlands Wellington FC. As a member of PSMS Medan, he won the 2005 Piala Emas Bang Yos (Gold Cup Bang Yos) alongside his compatriots Mario Quiñones, Christian González and Alejandro Tobar.

His last club was Medan Chiefs in Liga Premier Indonesia. It is a club that owned by Sihar Sitorus, a businessman tha own Pro Titan FC in Medan, Indonesia.

Following his retirement, he has developed a career as coach at youth academies.

Personal life
Hicks made his home in Jakarta.

Honours
PSMS Medan
  (Gold Cup Bang Yos):

References

External links

Luis Hicks at PlaymakerStats.com 

1977 births
Living people
People from Puerto Natales
Chilean people of English descent
Chilean footballers
Chilean expatriate footballers
Provincial Osorno footballers
Rangers de Talca footballers
Unión Española footballers
PSMS Medan players
Medan Jaya players
Persikabo Bogor players
Hougang United FC players
Woodlands Wellington FC players
Chilean Primera División players
Primera B de Chile players
Indonesian Premier Division players
Singapore Premier League players
Chilean expatriate sportspeople in Indonesia
Chilean expatriate sportspeople in Singapore
Expatriate footballers in Indonesia
Expatriate footballers in Singapore
Association football midfielders
Chilean football managers
Chilean expatriate football managers
Expatriate football managers in Indonesia